Within Brazil, Liberal Party may refer to:

 Liberal Party (Brazil, 1831) (existed until 1889)
 Liberal Party (Brazil, 1985) (merged in 2006 with the Republic Party)
 Liberal Party (Brazil, 2006) (known before 2019 as Party of the Republic)

See also 
 Partido Liberal (disambiguation)
 Liberal Party